Gerard David Tracey (9 March 1954 – 20 January 2003) was archivist at the Birmingham Oratory, and writer, editor and Newman scholar.

An adopted child, he was educated at Handsworth (by the Sisters of Mercy) and later attended St Philip's Grammar School, followed by University College, Oxford, where he studied history. In 1976, Newman's Oratorian editor Fr Stephen Dessain died and Tracey eventually took over the task of compiling information for the ultimately successful cause of Newman's canonisation.

Tracey died, aged 48, from undisclosed causes, on 20 January 2003. He was interred in the graveyard at the Oratory House, Rednal, outside Birmingham. He was survived by his mother.

Legacy

References

External links
Obituary in The Telegraph 
Obituary at The Times Online

1954 births
2003 deaths
Alumni of University College, Oxford
British people of Irish descent
British Roman Catholics
British writers
People from Birmingham, West Midlands
British archivists